Anuradha, sometimes shortened as Anu, is an Indian feminine given name. Notable people with the name include:

Given name
 Anuradha Acharya (born 1972), Indian entrepreneur
 Anuradha Bhat, Indian playback singer
 Anuradha Bhattacharyya (born 1975), Indian poet and writer
 Anuradha Biswal (born 1975), Indian track and field athlete
 Anuradha Choudhary (born 1960), Indian politician
 Anuradha Cooray (born 1978), Sri Lankan marathon runner
 Anuradha Desai, chairperson of the V H Group
 Anuradha Dullewe Wijeyeratne (born 1962), Sri Lankan politician and entrepreneur
 Anuradha Ghandy (1954–2008), Indian communist, writer and revolutionary
 Anuradha Jayaratne (born 1985), Sri Lankan politician
 Anuradha Kapur (born 1951), Indian theatre director, teacher and writer
 Anuradha Koirala (born 1949), Nepalese social activist
 Anuradha Lohia, Indian molecular parasitologist
 Anuradha Mehta (born 1981), Indian actress and former model
 Anuradha Menon, Indian television and theatre actress
 Anuradha N. Naik, Indian botanist
 Anuradha Pal, Indian tabla virtuosa and composer
 Anuradha Patel, Indian film actress
 Anuradha Patel (sculptor), Indian-born sculptor
 Anuradha Paudwal (born 1954), Indian playback and bhajan singer
 Anuradha Ramanan (1947–2010), Tamil writer, artist and social activist
 Anuradha Ray, Indian film actress
 Anuradha Roy (novelist) (born 1967), Indian novelist, journalist and editor
 Anuradha Sawhney, former head of operations of PETA India
 Anuradha Seneviratna (1938–2009), Sri Lankan writer and scholar
 Anuradha Sharma Pujari (born 1964), Assamese journalist and writer
 Anuradha Sriram (born 1970), Indian playback and carnatic singer
 Anuradha TK (born 1960), Indian scientist and engineer
 Anuradha Thokchom (born 1989), Indian hockey player
 Anuradha Vikram, art critic, curator and lecturer

Surname
 Dulani Anuradha, Sri Lankan actress and dancer
 Umarji Anuradha, Indian writer

Other
 Anuradha (actress), Sulochana, Indian film actress with stage name "Anuradha"
 Anu Hasan (born 1970), Tamil actress and television anchor born as Anuradha Chandrahasan
 Anuruddha, disciple and cousin of Gautama Buddha
 Tara (Kannada actress) (born 1973), Indian actress and politician born as Anuradha

See also
 Anu (name), a given name and surname found independently in several cultures

Indian feminine given names